Cabo Frio International Airport  is the airport serving Cabo Frio, Brazil.

The airport is operated by Aeropart.

History
The airport was built by the government of the state of Rio de Janeiro in partnership with the Brazilian Air Force. It was inaugurated in 1998 as a facility specialized in cargo transportation.

In September 2007 the first enlargement was completed, including a new terminal and enlargements of the runway and apron.

In June 2010 the second phase of enlargement works was inaugurated, including access roads, enlargement of the cargo terminal, apron, new administration offices and a dedicated terminal for Petrobras to operate flights to its offshore oil platforms of the Campos basin.

Since October 3, 2011 the airport is administrated by the private company Libra Aeroportos, using the name Costa do Sol Operadora Aeroportuária, as a concession from the Municipality of Cabo Frio. 
 
During holidays the airport often receives charter flights from Argentina, Chile, and Uruguay.

Airlines and destinations

Passenger

Scheduled cargo

Access

See also

List of airports in Brazil

References

External links

Airports in Rio de Janeiro (state)
Airports established in 1998
1998 establishments in Brazil